The 2017 Spring United Premier Soccer League season was the 8th season of the UPSL.

National playoffs
The national playoffs were played at Silverlakes Sports Complex in Norco, CA.

References

United Premier Soccer League seasons
2017 in American soccer leagues